A turboprop is a turbine engine that drives an aircraft propeller.

A turboprop consists of an intake, reduction gearbox, compressor, combustor, turbine, and a propelling nozzle. Air enters the intake and is compressed by the compressor. Fuel is then added to the compressed air in the combustor, where the fuel-air mixture then combusts. The hot combustion gases expand through the turbine stages, generating power at the point of exhaust. Some of the power generated by the turbine is used to drive the compressor and electric generator. The gases are then exhausted from the turbine. In contrast to a turbojet or turbofan, the engine's exhaust gases do not provide enough energy to create significant thrust, since almost all of the engine's power is used to drive the propeller.

Technological aspects

Exhaust thrust in a turboprop is sacrificed in favor of shaft power, which is obtained by extracting additional power (beyond that necessary to drive the compressor) from turbine expansion. Owing to the additional expansion in the turbine system, the residual energy in the exhaust jet is low. Consequently, the exhaust jet produces about 10% of the total thrust. A higher proportion of the thrust comes from the propeller at low speeds and less at higher speeds.

Turboprops have bypass ratios of 50–100, although the propulsion airflow is less clearly defined for propellers than for fans.

The propeller is coupled to the turbine through a reduction gear that converts the high RPM/low torque output to low RPM/high torque. The propeller itself is normally a constant-speed (variable pitch) propeller type similar to that used with larger aircraft reciprocating engines, except that the propeller-control requirements are very different.

To make the engine more compact, reverse airflow can be used. On a reverse-flow turboprop engine, the compressor intake is at the aft of the engine, and the exhaust is situated forward, reducing the distance between the turbine and the propeller.

Unlike the small-diameter fans used in turbofan engines, the propeller has a large diameter that lets it accelerate a large volume of air. This permits a lower airstream velocity for a given amount of thrust. Since it is more efficient at low speeds to accelerate a large amount of air by a small degree than a small amount of air by a large degree, a low disc loading (thrust per unit disc area) increases the aircraft's energy efficiency, and this reduces the fuel use.

Propellers work well until the flight speed of the aircraft is high enough that the airflow past the blade tips reaches the speed of sound. Beyond that speed, the proportion of the power that drives the propeller that is converted to propeller thrust falls dramatically. For this reason turboprop engines are not used on aircraft that fly faster than 0.6–0.7 Mach. However, propfan engines, which are very similar to turboprop engines, can cruise at flight speeds approaching 0.75 Mach. To maintain propeller efficiency across a wide range of airspeeds, turboprops use constant-speed (variable-pitch) propellers. The blades of a constant-speed propeller increase their pitch as aircraft speed increases. Another benefit of this type of propeller is that it can also be used to generate reverse thrust to reduce stopping distance on the runway. Additionally, in the event of an engine failure, the propeller can be feathered, thus minimizing the drag of the non-functioning propeller.

While the power turbine may be integral with the gas generator section, many turboprops today feature a free power turbine on a separate coaxial shaft. This enables the propeller to rotate freely, independent of compressor speed.

History

Alan Arnold Griffith had published a paper on compressor design in 1926. Subsequent work at the Royal Aircraft Establishment investigated axial compressor-based designs that would drive a propeller. From 1929, Frank Whittle began work on centrifugal compressor-based designs that would use all the gas power produced by the engine for jet thrust.

The world's first turboprop was designed by the Hungarian mechanical engineer György Jendrassik. Jendrassik published a turboprop idea in 1928, and on 12 March 1929 he patented his invention. In 1938, he built a small-scale (100 Hp; 74.6 kW) experimental gas turbine. The larger Jendrassik Cs-1, with a predicted output of 1,000 bhp, was produced and tested at the Ganz Works in Budapest between 1937 and 1941. It was of axial-flow design with 15 compressor and 7 turbine stages, annular combustion chamber. First run in 1940, combustion problems limited its output to 400 bhp. In 1941, the engine was abandoned due to war, and the factory was turned over to conventional engine production.

The first mention of turboprop engines in the general public press was in the February 1944 issue of the British aviation publication Flight, which included a detailed cutaway drawing of what a possible future turboprop engine could look like. The drawing was very close to what the future Rolls-Royce Trent would look like. The first British turboprop engine was the Rolls-Royce RB.50 Trent, a converted Derwent II fitted with reduction gear and a Rotol  five-bladed propeller. Two Trents were fitted to Gloster Meteor EE227 — the sole "Trent-Meteor" — which thus became the world's first turboprop-powered aircraft, albeit a test-bed not intended for production. It first flew on 20 September 1945. From their experience with the Trent, Rolls-Royce developed the Rolls-Royce Clyde, the first turboprop engine to receive a type certificate for military and civil use, and the Dart, which became one of the most reliable turboprop engines ever built. Dart production continued for more than fifty years. The Dart-powered Vickers Viscount was the first turboprop aircraft of any kind to go into production and sold in large numbers. It was also the first four-engined turboprop. Its first flight was on 16 July 1948. The world's first single engined turboprop aircraft was the Armstrong Siddeley Mamba-powered Boulton Paul Balliol, which first flew on 24 March 1948.

The Soviet Union built on German World War II turboprop preliminary design work by Junkers Motorenwerke, while BMW, Heinkel-Hirth and Daimler-Benz also worked on projected designs. While the Soviet Union had the technology to create the airframe for a jet-powered strategic bomber comparable to Boeing's B-52 Stratofortress, they instead produced the Tupolev Tu-95 Bear, powered with four Kuznetsov NK-12 turboprops, mated to eight contra-rotating propellers (two per nacelle) with supersonic tip speeds to achieve maximum cruise speeds in excess of 575 mph, faster than many of the first jet aircraft and comparable to jet cruising speeds for most missions. The Bear would serve as their most successful long-range combat and surveillance aircraft and symbol of Soviet power projection throughout the end of the 20th century. The USA used turboprop engines with contra-rotating propellers, such as the Allison T40, on some experimental aircraft during the 1950s. The T40-powered Convair R3Y Tradewind flying-boat was operated by the U.S. Navy for a short time.

The first American turboprop engine was the General Electric XT31, first used in the experimental Consolidated Vultee XP-81. The XP-81 first flew in December 1945, the first aircraft to use a combination of turboprop and turbojet power. The technology of Allison's earlier T38 design evolved into the Allison T56, used to power the Lockheed Electra airliner, its military maritime patrol derivative the P-3 Orion, and the C-130 Hercules military transport aircraft.

The first turbine-powered, shaft-driven helicopter was the Kaman K-225, a development of Charles Kaman's K-125 synchropter, which used a Boeing T50 turboshaft engine to power it on 11 December 1951.

Usage

In contrast to turbofans, turboprops are most efficient at flight speeds below 725 km/h (450 mph; 390 knots) because the jet velocity of the propeller (and exhaust) is relatively low. Modern turboprop airliners operate at nearly the same speed as small regional jet airliners but burn two-thirds of the fuel per passenger. However, compared to a turbojet (which can fly at high altitude for enhanced speed and fuel efficiency) a propeller aircraft has a lower ceiling.

Compared to piston engines, their greater power-to-weight ratio (which allows for shorter takeoffs) and reliability can offset their higher initial cost, maintenance and fuel consumption. As jet fuel can be easier to obtain than avgas in remote areas, turboprop-powered aircraft like the Cessna Caravan and Quest Kodiak are used as bush airplanes.

Turboprop engines are generally used on small subsonic aircraft, but the Tupolev Tu-114 can reach . Large military aircraft, like the Tupolev Tu-95, and civil aircraft, such as the Lockheed L-188 Electra, were also turboprop powered. The Airbus A400M is powered by four Europrop TP400 engines, which are the second most powerful turboprop engines ever produced, after the  Kuznetsov NK-12.

In 2017, the most widespread turboprop airliners in service were the ATR 42/72 (950 aircraft), Bombardier Q400 (506), De Havilland Canada Dash 8-100/200/300 (374), Beechcraft 1900 (328), de Havilland Canada DHC-6 Twin Otter (270), Saab 340 (225). Less widespread and older airliners include the BAe Jetstream 31, Embraer EMB 120 Brasilia, Fairchild Swearingen Metroliner, Dornier 328, Saab 2000, Xian MA60, MA600 and MA700, Fokker 27 and 50.

Turboprop business aircraft include the Piper Meridian, Socata TBM, Pilatus PC-12, Piaggio P.180 Avanti, Beechcraft King Air and Super King Air. In April 2017, there were 14,311 business turboprops in the worldwide fleet.

Reliability

Between 2012 and 2016, the ATSB observed 417 events with turboprop aircraft, 83 per year, over 1.4 million flight hours: 2.2 per 10,000 hours.
Three were "high risk" involving engine malfunction and unplanned landing in single‑engine Cessna 208 Caravans, four "medium risk" and 96% "low risk".
Two occurrences resulted in minor injuries due to engine malfunction and terrain collision in agricultural aircraft and five accidents involved aerial work: four in agriculture and one in an air ambulance.

Current engines

See also
 Jet engine
 Jetboat
 Scimitar propeller
 Supercharger
 Tiltrotor
 Turbocharger

References

Bibliography
Green, W. and Cross, R.The Jet Aircraft of the World (1955). London: MacDonald
 
 
 James, D.N. Gloster Aircraft since 1917 (1971). London: Putnam & Co.

Further reading

External links
 Jet Turbine Planes by LtCol Silsbee USAAF, Popular Science, December 1945, first article on turboprops printed
 Wikibooks: Jet propulsion
 "Development of the Turboprop" – a 1950 Flight article on UK and US turboprop engines

Gas turbines
Aircraft engines
Jet engines